Two ships of the Iranian Navy have borne the name Paykan

 , a French-made Kaman-class missile boat sunk during Operation Morvarid in 1980
 , a Sina-class missile boat

Ship names